The Shalun Line is a branch line of the Taiwan Railways Administration (TRA) West Coast line in Tainan, Taiwan. It was built to link the Western Line to the Taiwan High Speed Rail (THSR) Tainan Station, speeding up transit times between downtown Tainan and the THSR station, with services running from Nanke railway station or Tainan TRA station to Shalun Station, next to the THSR station. The line opened on January 2, 2011.

History

The Shalun Line was proposed as a solution to the lack of a rail connection between the Tainan metropolitan area and the Taiwan High Speed Rail station in Gueiren. Originally, in plans developed in the 1990s, the Red Line of the planned Tainan MRT system was designed to address this issue, but financial considerations meant the MRT project had to be shelved indefinitely. After public consultation the Executive Yuan decided to prioritize a regular rail link between the THSR and TRA rail systems. The initial budget for the construction of the Shalun Line was NT$5.8 billion.

Construction

With the exception of the end of the junction with the Western Line, the line is completely elevated. Work was originally planned to be completed in 2009, but due to flood prevention work on Erren River, which crosses under the rail line, the completion date was pushed back to January 2011. There have been some complaints from local residents that the increased number of trains passing through Tainan will increase the number of times road traffic must stop at level crossings to let trains pass. The line has three stations: the existing TRA Western Line Zhongzhou Station, which was renovated and modified as a junction station, and the newly built Chang Jung University, and Shalun Stations.

Operation

Longer services run between TRA Western Line's Nanke Station, near Tainan Science Park in Tainan's Sinshih District, and Shalun Station; with intermediate stops at Xinshi, Yongkang, Daqiao, Tainan, Bao'an, Rende, Zhongzhou, and Chang Jung University. Shorter services run between Tainan and Shalun. Further plans foresee the construction of a new station, Linsen Station, and the reopening of the previously closed South Tainan Station, both in the Tainan metropolitan area. An additional station was considered at Tainan Airport, but was cancelled.

The line was opened on January 2, 2011 as TRA's first new line in 30 years. The line cuts the journey time between TRA Tainan and THSR Tainan stations to 21–22 minutes, against the shuttle bus travel time of around 50 minutes. The ticket price for a Tainan–Shalun ride was set at NT$25, but travel was free during the first two weeks. The initial schedule contains 70 trains a day.

LCD screens aboard each train allow for passengers to view instant location and transfer information, similar to Tokyo's Yamanote Line.

Stations

References

External links

 Railway Reconstruction Bureau project page (in Chinese)

2011 establishments in Taiwan
TRA routes
Transportation in Tainan
Railway lines opened in 2011
3 ft 6 in gauge railways in Taiwan